Lt Col Inka Niskanen is an officer and fighter pilot in the Finnish Air Force. She is notable as the first woman in Finland to qualify to pilot a fighter jet; the first to command an air force squadron; and the first to reach, upon her promotion in June 2018, the rank of lieutenant colonel.

In 1997, Niskanen volunteered for national military service (which for women is not mandatory in Finland) at the Training Air Wing, Finnish Air Force, at Kauhava. Following that, in 1998, she was accepted as the first female cadet into the air force officer training programme at the National Defence University, which she completed in 2002, being commissioned as a flight officer, and qualifying to fly the Hornet fighter jets.

In 2014, Niskanen was promoted to major and in the summer of 2018 to lieutenant colonel. In January 2019, Niskanen took command of the Karelia Air Command 31 Squadron, as the first woman to hold such a post in Finland.

From August 2021, she has worked at the National Defence University as the lead lecturer in aerial warfare studies.

References

Finnish Air Force personnel
Women air force personnel
1974 births
Date of birth missing (living people)
Place of birth missing (living people)
Living people